Villers-sur-Mer is a commune in the Calvados department in Normandy, northwestern France, with a population of 2,644 as of 2017.

Geography 
The commune is located on the French coast of the English Channel, on the Côte Fleurie, between Deauville and Houlgate, approximately 200 km from Paris.

It is the northernmost French commune through which falls the Prime meridian. The latter is represented on the seafront promenade with a blue mark on the ground and on the parapet. This mark is positioned 32 metres west of the actual meridian in use today, the IERS Reference Meridian.

History 
It seems that Villers-sur-Mer (then known as Villers) was more akin to a group of hamlets during the early 19th century. According to the Cassini map (drawn in the 18th century), Villers at that time is made up of a church, two farms (La Motte and Fontaine), and a castle.

Population
The town had a population of 2,644 in 2017, posting a growth of just under 50 residents between then and 2007.

Sights

Villers-sur-Mer is known for the large topiary dinosaurs facing the sea from the garden of the office of tourism. In certain years, a baby dinosaur is added to the garden. It is the starting point of the Vaches Noires cliffsa site where many fossils have been discovered. There is a small museum in the enclosure of the office of tourism, which has an outline of the resources and discoveries. It is a place widely known by specialists in the ammonites and other fossils.

Curiosity
On the beach of Villers-sur-Mer (last stretch of rue Alfred Feine), the famous last scene of the first film by François Truffaut was shot: Les Quatre Cent Coups ends with a freeze frame of its boy hero running towards the sea.

Transportation
Villers-sur-Mer station is on the line from Deauville to Dives-sur-Mer. The station building is no longer open but train services operate year-round on weekends, and also on weekdays during the summer.

See also
 Communes of the Calvados department
 Adélaïde-Louise d'Eckmühl de Blocqueville (1815–1892), salon holder, died in Villers-sur-Mer.

References

External links

Official site

Communes of Calvados (department)
Seaside resorts in France
Calvados communes articles needing translation from French Wikipedia